This is a timeline of local television in the United Kingdom. This refers to stations transmitting to a small area such as a city or part of a county, not to larger regions covered by ITV and BBC regions.

1970s 
 1972
 The UK's Minister for Posts and Telecommunications authorises five experimental community cable television channels. The first to launch is Greenwich Cablevision.

 1973
Sheffield Cablevision, The Bristol Channel and Swindon Viewpoint launch.

 1974
 March – The final community station, Wellingborough Cablevision, launches.

 1975
14 March – After less than two years on air, The Bristol Channel closes.
24 March – Wellingborough Cablevision closes.

 1976
 2 January – Sheffield Cablevision closes when the funds run out.
 Greenwich Cablevision closes as a full time service although programming made by volunteers keeps the station on air in a restricted form until the early 1980s.
Swindon Viewpoint’s experimental phase ends when EMI decided to pull out of funding the service. However, the channel continues after it was sold to the public of Swindon for £1.

 1977
No events.

 1978
No events.

 1979
No events.

1980s  
 1980
 April – Regular programming on Swindon Viewpoint ends when funding dries up. but continues intermittently for the next decade with programmes made by volunteers.

 1981
Radio Rental Cable Television launches the UK's first pay-per-view movie channel, 'Cinematel', for cable viewers in Swindon. As well as showing movies, the channel also broadcasts some local programming, including one-off documentaries and shortly after a live news-magazine format programme,  called Scene in Swindon launches. Also provided is a local teletext service, with pages about film information, horoscopes, recipes, local bus times and job vacancies.

 1982
 No events.

 1983
 No events.

 1984
 No events.

 1985
 Swindon's cable service is rebranded as Swindon Cable and its news programme is renamed as part of this move and became Focus on Swindon. The channel increases the programme's frequency from twice a week to three times a week.

 1986
 4 February – Thorn EMI sells its stake in Swindon Cable to British Telecom and the new owners axe Focus on Swindon and other local programming and replaces it with bought-in content.

 1987
 No events.

 1988
 Swindon cable's TV channel is relaunched as Swindon's Local Channel. This sees the return to the service of local news, sport and one-off documentaries.

 1989
 No events.

1990s  
 1990
 No events.

 1991
 No events.

 1992
 No events.

 1993
 No events.

 1994
 November – Associated Newspapers launches a rolling news service for London called Channel One. It is only available on cable and only in some areas.

 1995
 L!VE TV launches the first of its local television channels. Out of a planned network of around 20 channels, only a few make it to air.

 1996
 No events.

 1997
 No events.

 1998
25 September – After less than four years on air, Channel One closes at 6pm.

 1999
 C9TV (Channel 9 Television) launches as a local television station channel in Derry.
 27 May – MATV Channel 6 begins broadcasting to the Asian community in Leicester on UHF Channel 68 (frequency 847.25 MHz - Horizontally polarised) from 27 May 1999 until late 2009.
 6 June – The Oxford Channel begins broadcasting.
 5 November – L!VE TV closes and so do its local channels.

2000s 
 2000
 14 February – Channel M begins broadcasting as a RSL station, available free-to-air on terrestrial in parts of Greater Manchester.

 2001
May – Channel Six Dundee starts broadcasting.
 The Oxford Channel is sold to Milestone Group and is relaunched as Six TV.

 2002
 July – Channel Six Dundee stops broadcasting.
 31 October – Solent TV starts broadcasting to the Isle of Wight.

 2003
No events,

 2004
 9 February – Belfast local channel NVTV starts broadcasting.

2005
 No events.

 2006
 No events.

 2007
 C9TV stops all new programme production with much of the station's transmission time now consisting of simulcasts of Sky News.
 16 April – Channel M launches a breakfast show Channel M Breakfast.
 24 May – Solent TV stops broadcasting.

 2008
 No events.

 2009
 C9TV stops broadcasting after ten years on air.
 April – Six TV stops broadcasting after a decade of broadcasting to the Oxford area.
 27 April – Channel M's then-chief executive Mark Dodson announces that the station was looking to make 41 redundancies from its 74 staff and restrict weekday live programming from four programmes (totalling six hours of output, including a breakfast show Channel M Breakfast) to one three-hour news magazine programme, broadcast between 4pm and 7pm, in order to cut losses. The new live programme, Channel M Today launches on Monday 13 July 2009.

2010s
2010
 March – Channel M Today ends. 29 of the station's 33 staff were made redundant. The station goes on to broadcast a mix of archived programming, original output from Salford University and simulcasts of Euronews and Real Radio North West alongside some new programming from independent and third party producers.
 5 October – UTV HD launches, but only on Virgin Media.

2011
No events.

2012
 16 April – Channel M closes after 12 years of broadcasting. The station's owners, GMG Radio,  said UK government plans for localised television services would not allow the station to run a commercially viable service in the future. Local programming and ended several months earlier resulting in a schedule consisting of simulcasts of Real Radio North West and Euronews and acquired programming from The Community Channel. 
 10 May – Ofcom invites bids for local TV services in 34 areas of the UK.
 August – 57 applications were received to provide these services.
 October – Belfast local channel NVTV stops broadcasting ahead of digital switchover but it continues to stream its programming online. 
 23 October – At just after 11.30 pm, Digital switchover is completed in the UK when analogue television signals in Northern Ireland are switched off.

2013
 13 March – Ofcom announces that 14 more areas had been selected to invite bids for local television services, in addition to re-advertising the previously un-awarded Swansea and Plymouth locations. However many of the licenses are not awarded.
 26 November – Estuary TV launches on Freeview, becoming the first Local Digital Television Programme Services to launch.

2014
 24 March – Mustard TV begins broadcasting to the Norwich area.
 31 March – At 6.30pm, London Live begins broadcasting.
 27 May – Notts TV begins broadcasting.
 2 June – STV launches the first of its local television channels – STV Glasgow.
 28 August – Latest TV begins broadcasting to the Brighton area.
 23 September – Sheffield Live TV begins broadcasting.
 29 September – NVTV is relaunched following the channel being awarded a 12-year local TV licence by Ofcom.
 8 October – Made in Bristol begins broadcasting.
 15 October – Made in Cardiff begins broadcasting as Cardiff's local television channel.
 6 November – Made in Cardiff begins broadcasting.
 12 November – Made in Tyne & Wear begins broadcasting.
 26 November – That's Solent begins broadcasting.
 4 December – Bay TV Liverpool begins broadcasting on Freeview. The channel had been on air since 2011 when it had launched as a video-on-demand service.

2015
 12 January – STV launches its second local television channel STV Edinburgh.
 28 February – Big Centre TV begins broadcasting.
 19 March – STV is awarded three more local licenses, to cover Aberdeen, Ayr and Dundee.
 17 April – That's Oxfordshire begins broadcasting.
 31 May – That's Manchester begins broadcasting.
 18 August – That’s Cambridge begins broadcasting.
 24 August – That’s Lancashire begins broadcasting to the Preston and Blackpool areas of west Lancashire.

2016
 Following the closure of BBC Three, the local stations move from Channel 8 to channel 7 in England and Northern Ireland, and from channel 23 to channel 8 in Scotland and Wales.
 April – Ofcom gives London Live permission to reduce the amount of local shows that it has to broadcast at peak time to one hour per day.
 12 July – That's Swansea Bay begins broadcasting.
 October – Bay TV stops broadcasting at 11pm on Sunday 9 October 2016 and reopens as Made in Liverpool at 6pm on Wednesday 19 October 2016. the change follows Bay TV entering administration six weds earlier. The station owed a total of £451,575, with a debt to Revenue and Customs outstanding at £145,187, individual shareholder loans debts to the value of £133,800, and other “trade and expense creditors” to the sum of £152,488.
 November – Big Centre TV stops broadcasting to Birmingham  at midnight on Friday 4 November 2016 and reopened and relaunched as Made in Birmingham at 6pm on Tuesday 8 November 2016. The change takes place following Made Television, which was unsuccessful in bidding to run the franchise in 2012, purchase of Big Centre TV.

2017
 30 March – Made in Teesside begins broadcasting.
19 April – Cardiff TV's flagship news bulletin Cardiff News is broadcast for the final time. The programme is replaced by a mixed bulletin of local and national news produced at Made TV's headquarters in Leeds.
 24 April – STV merges its local channels and relaunches them as a single channel called STV2. The change sees STV launch a primetime weeknight news programme called STV News Tonight which combined news from across all of Scotland with UK and international news. this day also sees local TV beginning in other areas of Scotland including Aberdeen, Ayr and Dundee.
 26 April – Local television comes to north east Wales when Made in North Wales begins broadcasting.
 May – That's Thames Valley begins broadcasting to the Reading area of Berkshire.
 23 May – That’s Hampshire begins broadcasting.
 25 May – The Made channels begin carrying acquired programming for the first time, from the UK & Ireland version of factual entertainment channel TruTV as part of a supply agreement with Sony Pictures Television. The stations simulcast TruTV in two daily blocks from 1-5pm and from 9pm-1am. 
 26 June – That’s York begins broadcasting.
 11 July – KMTV Kent begins broadcasting to Maidstone and Tonbridge.
 19 July – That’s Salisbury begins broadcasting.
 25 July – That’s Carlisle begins broadcasting.
 1 August – That’s North Yorkshire begins broadcasting to the Scarborough area.
 2 August – That's Surrey begins broadcasting.
 31 August – Mustard TV broadcasts its last show, having been sold to the That's TV group. It is replaced by That’s TV Norfolk.
 November – Following a restructuring of Made network's operations, local programming is cut and studio production of daily news and magazine programmes is centralised at Made's Leeds and Birmingham stations. Also, the Made channels begin simulcasting CBS Reality for 11 hours a day.

2018
 February – Cardiff Live is launched as Made in Cardiff's sole local programme. The bulletin however is not live but it is produced locally. At around the same time, Made in Cardiff and Made in North Wales are relaunched as Cardiff TV and North Wales TV respectively.
 30 June – STV2 closes down and the channel's assets are sold to That's Media, owners of the That's TV network of local television stations in England. The closure results in the cancellation of STV News Tonight.
 19 August – Made Television is rebranded as Local Television Limited and all sub stations are renamed according to their city.
 15 October – That's TV Scotland launches as the replacement local television service in Aberdeen, Ayr, Dundee, Edinburgh and Glasgow.

2019
 July – That's TV announces the closure of 13 of its 20 studios in order to downsize to seven regional production centres producing content for its 20 local stations.

2020s
2020
 12 November – That's TV is temporarily rebranded as That’s Christmas and mixes up its music programming - which had become to main focus of output since earlier in 2020 - so that Christmas hits would be played alongside 'party classics' from the 70s, 80s or 90s. Local news is reduced to a 10 minute slot at 6pm.

2021
 January – Local Television Limited begins broadcasting a service targeting viewers in Manchester. Unlike the group's other channels, Manchester TV is not the official local-TV service provider and therefore Manchester TV occupyies a lower berth (LCN 99 at launch) and transmits on the legacy Greater Manchester multiplex originally set up for the defunct Channel M service.

2022
 No events.

References

British history timelines
Culture-related timelines
Television Local
Television in the United Kingdom by year
United Kingdom television timelines